Patriarch Kalinik may refer to:

 Kalinik I, Serbian Patriarch in 1691–1710
 Kalinik II, Serbian Patriarch in 1765–1766